Henrietta Phelps Jeffries (January 5, 1857 in Halifax County, Virginia – August 22, 1926 in Caswell County, North Carolina) was an African American midwife and a founding member of the Macedonia A.M.E. Church located in Milton, North Carolina.

Biography
Henrietta Phelps was born the daughter of a slave, Elija "Phelps", and Charlotte Ann Bennett, a midwife. Henrietta was the oldest daughter in a family of 7 children. She grew up in her family home with her parents until her first marriage to George Lawson of Milton, North Carolina, on January 21, 1872, at the age of 15. The marriage produced a son, George, Jr. Henrietta was widowed by age 22. She subsequently married James Allen Jeffries, a tobacco farmer of Leasburg, North Carolina, in Milton town, Caswell County, on July 30, 1881. Henrietta had 11 children with Allen Jeffries (as he was informally known), and was mother to 18 children total. The family resided in Milton, North Carolina.

Henrietta was literate, able to read, and listed the nature of her occupation as "doctress", working on her own account as a "midwife", according to the 1910 U.S. census. She is recorded having birthed "hundreds of children, both black and white" throughout Caswell County, North Carolina. It appears that Henrietta learned midwifery from her mother, who was also a midwife.

Henrietta Phelps Lawson Jeffries died of chronic nephritis on August 22, 1926. She is buried at Macedonia A.M.E. Church on Yarborough Road in Milton, North Carolina.

In 1985, Mrs. Henrietta Jeffries was listed as one of the "First Ladies of Caswell County, Past and Present.

Trial
Henrietta was brought to trial on charges of "practicing medicine without a license" in 1911. The penalty, at the time in U.S. history, if convicted, was death by hanging.

Jeffries' trial was a historic event for the small town of Milton, NC, as it gained national attention in the press of that time. The jury was an all-white, all-male bench. The judge in the case listened to an unrepresented Henrietta defend herself based on her Christian faith. The judge then dismissed himself from the bench, came down and stood beside Mrs. Jeffries, defended her cause, and then as judge, overrode any jury decision, and dismissed the charges. Such a trial dismissal was unprecedented for an American woman of color during the early part of the 20th century. Henrietta Jeffries continued her profession as midwife until her natural death in 1926.

The trial has been recorded in William S. Powell's book, When the Past Refused to Die: A History of Caswell County, North Carolina, 1777–1977.

Production
The Trial of Henrietta Jeffries was made into a reenactment film, entitled, "The Trial of Henrietta Jeffries". The film was produced by Piedmont Community College, Roxboro, North Carolina, in 2002, featuring many of Henrietta Jeffries' descendants as characters in the work.

On August 22, 2018, WRAL-TV News (Raleigh, NC) reported a segment about Henrietta Jeffries' life story on reporter Scott Mason's series, "Tar Heel Traveler - Midwife delivered hundreds of babies despite bigotry".

References

Sources
 Powell, William S. When the Past Refused to Die: A History of Caswell County North Carolina 1777–1977. NC: Caswell County Historical Society, 1982. Print.
 The Trial of Henrietta Jeffries, A Piedmont Community College Production, 2002. Video.

External links
 The Trial of Henrietta Jeffries (2012). Caswell County Historical Association. 
 Tar Heel Traveler: Midwife delivered hundreds of babies despite bigotry (2018). WRAL-TV, Raleigh, NC
 Remembering Henrietta Jeffries: The Caswell County Midwife (2022). WRAL-TV, Raleigh, NC

1857 births
1926 deaths
American midwives
People from Caswell County, North Carolina
African Methodist Episcopal Church